This article lists the squads for the 2023 Cyprus Women's Cup, the 14th edition of the Cyprus Women's Cup. The cup consisted of a series of friendly games, and was held in Cyprus from 16 to 22 February 2023. The four national teams involved in the tournament registered a squad of 23 players.

The age listed for each player is on 16 February 2023, the first day of the tournament. The numbers of caps and goals listed for each player do not include any matches played after the start of tournament. The club listed is the club for which the player last played a competitive match prior to the tournament. The nationality for each club reflects the national association (not the league) to which the club is affiliated. A flag is included for coaches that are of a different nationality than their own national team.

Squads

Croatia
Coach: Nenad Gračan

The squad was announced on 6 February 2023.

Finland
Coach: Marko Saloranta

The squad was announced on 3 February 2023.

Hungary
Coach:  Margret Kratz

The squad was announced on 7 February 2023. The following week, Barbara Bíró and Emese Szakonyi withdrew from the squad and were replaced by Evelin Erős and Eszter Csigi.

Romania
Coach: Cristian Dulca

The squad was announced on 6 February 2023.

Player representation

By club
Clubs with 3 or more players represented are listed.

By club nationality

By club federation

By representatives of domestic league

References

2023